Rupasinghe Jayawardene Mudiyanselage Gihan Madushanka Rupasinghe (born March 5, 1986, in Watupitiwala) is a professional Sri Lankan T20I cricketer.

International career
Rupasinghe is the 30th Twenty20 International Cap for Sri Lanka. He made his T20I debut on 2 September 2009 against New Zealand.

School and domestic career
He was educated at Nalanda College Colombo. Rupasinghe is OBSERVER-BATA Schoolboy Cricketer of the Year 2006 and also became the best all rounder in 2006. He captained Nalanda College first XI team in 2006. Rupasinghe played for Sri Lanka Schools under-17 team at the Asian Schools Cricket Tournament held in Sri Lanka in 2002 and toured with the Sri Lanka under-19 cricket team to Pakistan in 2005. He was also included to the 2004 Under-19 Cricket World Cup Squad as well.

In November 2021, he was selected to play for the Colombo Stars following the players' draft for the 2021 Lanka Premier League.

References

 

 

 

1986 births
Living people
Sri Lankan cricketers
Sri Lanka Twenty20 International cricketers
Alumni of Nalanda College, Colombo
Kalutara Town Club cricketers
Tamil Union Cricket and Athletic Club cricketers
Moors Sports Club cricketers
Basnahira South cricketers
Colombo Cricket Club cricketers
Ruhuna Royals cricketers